Periodic fever syndromes  are a set of disorders characterized by recurrent episodes of systemic and organ-specific inflammation. Unlike autoimmune disorders such as systemic lupus erythematosus, in which the disease is caused by abnormalities of the adaptive immune system, people with autoinflammatory diseases do not produce autoantibodies or antigen-specific T or B cells.  Instead, the autoinflammatory diseases are characterized by errors in the innate immune system.

The syndromes are diverse, but tend to cause episodes of fever, joint pains, skin rashes, abdominal pains and may lead to chronic complications such as amyloidosis.

Most autoinflammatory diseases are genetic and present during childhood.  The most common genetic autoinflammatory syndrome is familial Mediterranean fever, which causes short episodes of fever, abdominal pain, serositis, lasting less than 72 hours.  It is caused by mutations in the MEFV gene, which codes for the protein pyrin.

Pyrin is a protein normally present in the inflammasome.  The mutated pyrin protein is thought to cause inappropriate activation of the inflammasome, leading to release of the pro-inflammatory cytokine IL-1β.  Most other autoinflammatory diseases also cause disease by inappropriate release of IL-1β.  Thus, IL-1β has become a common therapeutic target, and medications such as anakinra, rilonacept, and canakinumab have revolutionized the treatment of autoinflammatory diseases.

However, there are some autoinflammatory diseases that are not known to have a clear genetic cause.  This includes PFAPA, which is the most common autoinflammatory disease seen in children, characterized by episodes of fever, aphthous stomatitis, pharyngitis, and cervical adenitis.  Other autoinflammatory diseases that do not have clear genetic causes include adult-onset Still's disease, systemic-onset juvenile idiopathic arthritis, Schnitzler syndrome, and chronic recurrent multifocal osteomyelitis.  It is likely that these diseases are multifactorial, with genes that make people susceptible to these diseases, but they require an additional environmental factor to trigger the disease.

Individual periodic fever syndromes

See also 
 Kawasaki disease - possible autoinflammatory mechanism
 Multisystem inflammatory syndrome in children
 List of cutaneous conditions

Further reading 
 Hobart A. Reimann, Periodic Disease: a probable syndrome including periodic fever, benign paroxysmal peritonitis, cyclic neutropenia and intermittent arthralgia. JAMA, 1948.
 Hobart A Reimann, Periodic Disease: periodic fever, periodic abdominalgia, cyclic neutropenia, intermittent arthralgia, angioneurotic edema, anaphylactoid purpura and periodic paralysis. JAMA, 1949.
 Hobart A Reimann, Moadié, J; Semerdjian, S; Sahyoun, PF, Periodic Peritonitis—Heredity & Pathology: report of seventy-two cases. JAMA, 1954.
 Hobart A Reimann, Periodic fever, an entity: A collection of 52 cases. AmJMedSci, 1962.

References

External links 

 Understanding Autoinflammatory Diseases - US National Institute of Arthritis and Musculoskeletal and Skin Diseases

Inflammations
Autoinflammatory syndromes